Michael von Biel (born 30 June 1937) is a German composer, cellist, and graphic artist.

Life
Biel was born in Hamburg, the son of Werner von Biel and Ursula von Biel (née Lampert). After finishing school in Canterbury, England, he studied piano, theory, and composition in Toronto (1956–57), Vienna (1958–60), New York (1960, with Morton Feldman, amongst others), London (1961–62, with Cornelius Cardew), and Cologne (with Karlheinz Stockhausen). From 1961 to 1963 he attended the Darmstadt International Vacation/Holiday Courses for New Music. In 1964 he received a commission from the WDR for the electronic piece Fassung. From 1965–66 he was Composer in Residence at the State University of New York in Buffalo. Since 1966 Michael von Biel has lived in Cologne, where he came into contact with artists of the Fluxus movement. From 1968–69 he studied with Joseph Beuys at the Düsseldorf Kunstakademie. In the following years he created works in the visual realm especially. His Jagdstück (1966) for brass, contrabass, tape, and amplified barbecues was probably partly inspired by his contact to artists from the Fluxus movement.

Compositions (selective list)
Für Klavier no.1–3 (three piano pieces for Morton Feldman), for piano four-hands (1960–61)
Book for Three, for violin and two pianos, or three pianos (1961–62)
Doubles, 29 pieces for violin and piano (1961)
String Quartet No. 1 (1962)
String Quartet No. 2 (1963)
Fassung, electronic music for four loudspeaker groups(1963–64)
Quartett mit Begleitung, for string quartet and cello (1965)
Deklination, for alto voice, piano, 3 percussionists, harp, cello, contrabass, and electronics  (1965)
Welt I and II, action scores (1965–66)
The Plain of S'cairn, for five or more winds and five or more strings (1966)
Jagdstück for brass, contrabass, tape, and amplified barbecues (1966) 
Composition for orchestra (1968)
Deutsche Landschaften, for solo cello (1970)
Cello Concerto (1971)
Übungsstück, for solo cello with filtered feedback (1971)
Preludes, for cello (1972)
13 traditionelle Stücke, for 2 guitars (1974–77)
Pieces for two guitars (1976)
Fragment, for two electric guitars (1981)
Nineteen Pieces for piano, synthesizer, glockenspiel, percussion, and electric guitar (1985)
Twenty-eight Pieces for Piano (1987–89) 
Acht Projekt (Aufsatzstück), for piano (1992) 
Pieces for piano (1992)

Sources

Further reading

External links
Feedback Studio survey of works

Living people
1937 births
German classical composers
20th-century classical composers
21st-century classical composers
German classical cellists
Pupils of Karlheinz Stockhausen
German male classical composers
20th-century German composers
21st-century German composers
20th-century German male musicians
21st-century German male musicians
20th-century cellists
21st-century cellists